Imamzadeh Shah Zeyd is an imamzadeh in Isfahan, Iran. It belongs to the early Safavid era. It is well known for paintings on its walls. These paintings are about the Battle of Karbala. Cavalries are in most of the paintings, but there are also other elements such as veiled women, dead bodies, birds, mosques and even flowers and nightingales. The painter of the artworks is Abbas Shahzadeh. He has tried to use the available space as much as he can.

References 

Architecture in Iran
Buildings and structures in Isfahan